Lesmes is a surname. Notable people with the surname include:

Aurelio García Lesmes (1884–1942), Spanish landscape painter
Carlos Lesmes (born 1958), Spanish judge and prosecutor
Francisco Lesmes (1924–2005), Spanish footballer
Rafael Lesmes (1926–2012), Spanish footballer, brother of Francisco
Spanish-language surnames

Surnames of Colombian origin